The 1983 Murjani Cup was a women's tennis tournament played on outdoor clay courts in Palm Beach, Florida in the United States that was part of the 1983 Virginia Slims World Championship Series. The tournament was held from January 30 through February 6, 1983. Chris Evert-Lloyd won the singles title.

Finals

Singles

 Chris Evert-Lloyd defeated  Andrea Jaeger 6–3, 6–3
 It was Evert-Lloyd's 1st title of the year and the 125th of her career.

Doubles

 Barbara Potter /  Sharon Walsh defeated  Kathy Jordan /  Paula Smith 6–4, 4–6, 6–2
 It was Potter's 1st title of the year and the 7th of her career. It was Walsh's 1st title of the year and the 1st of her career.

References

 
Murjani Cup
Palm Beach Cup
1983 in American tennis
1983 in sports in Florida